Gromyki is a rural locality (a settlement) in Pochepsky District, Bryansk Oblast, Russia. The population was 510 as of 2010. There are 8 streets.

Geography 
Gromyki is located 7 km north of Pochep (the district's administrative centre) by road. Pochep and Setolovo are the nearest rural localities.

References 

Rural localities in Pochepsky District